Marcus Jeffrey Williams (born March 24, 1991) is a former American football cornerback. He was signed by the Houston Texans as an undrafted free agent in 2014. He played college football at North Dakota State University. He also played for the New York Jets, Arizona Cardinals, New Orleans Saints, Tampa Bay Buccaneers, and Chicago Bears.

High school career
Williams stood out at Hopkins High School in Minnetonka, MN in both basketball and football, and decided on playing football at NDSU since he didn't receive a Big 10 offer for basketball.

College career
Williams set the NDSU school record with 21 career interceptions. Williams also set the FCS D1-AA record with career interception returns for touchdown with 7. He had 8 defensive touchdowns in total.

Williams received Associated Press First-team All-American honors in 2011, 2012, and 2013, as well as Walter Camp FCS All American Team honors in 2011, 2012, & 2013.

Professional career

Houston Texans
On May 16, 2014, Williams signed with the Houston Texans. On August 30, 2014, Williams was released by the Texans.

New York Jets
Williams was signed to the New York Jets' practice squad on September 26, 2014. He was promoted to the active roster on October 28, 2014. In his debut against the Kansas City Chiefs on November 2, 2014, he played for the majority of the game. He had a team-high seven tackles and one pass defensed, earning the praise of head coach Rex Ryan for his performance. In 8 games of his rookie season in 2014, Williams made 37 tackles, an interception, and seven passes defended.

On October 4, 2015, he made a game clinching interception against the Miami Dolphins in a game in London. One month later, against the Jacksonville Jaguars, he got two interceptions, a career-high, one of which clinched the game. On December 19, 2015, he made the game winning interception against the Dallas Cowboys, his third game winning interception of the season. Despite being a substitute cornerback, Williams would appear in 13 games making 21 tackles, six interceptions, 1.5 sacks, ten passes defended, a forced fumble, and a fumble recovery.

On March 9, 2017, the Jets placed a second-round tender on Williams. On October 9, 2017, Williams was released by the Jets.

Houston Texans (second stint)
On October 10, 2017, Williams was claimed off waivers by the Texans. On October 30, 2017, he recorded his first interception of the season, picking off the Seattle Seahawks' Russell Wilson in the fourth quarter. He finished his second stint with the Texans with twelve tackles and an interception in ten games.

Arizona Cardinals
On April 19, 2018, Williams signed a one year deal with the Arizona Cardinals. On May 21, 2018, Williams was released by the Cardinals.

New Orleans Saints
On August 11, 2018, Williams signed with the New Orleans Saints. He was released on September 1, 2018.

Tampa Bay Buccaneers
On September 11, 2018, Williams signed with the Tampa Bay Buccaneers. He was placed on injured reserve on October 13, 2018 with a hamstring injury. He was released on October 22, 2018.

Chicago Bears
On December 12, 2018, Williams was signed by the Chicago Bears.

References

External links
 North Dakota State Bison bio
 New York Jets bio

1991 births
Living people
People from Minnetonka, Minnesota
Players of American football from Minneapolis
American football cornerbacks
North Dakota State Bison football players
Houston Texans players
New York Jets players
Arizona Cardinals players
New Orleans Saints players
Tampa Bay Buccaneers players
Chicago Bears players
Hopkins High School alumni